Kinne is an Australian sketch comedy television series which first aired on 7mate on 8 July 2014. Season 2 began airing on 23 April 2015.

A DVD of the complete series 1 and 2 was released 1 September 2015 exclusively to home entertainment retailer JB Hi-Fi.

Cast
 Troy Kinne
 Shanrah Wakefield
 Elliot Loney
 Nick Cody
 Des Dowling
 CJ Fortuna
 Nicolette Minster
 Nikki Osborne
 Tom Siegert
 Emma-Louise Wilson
 Max Price
 Celia Pacquola
 Josh Lawson
 Ronny Chieng
 Andy Lee

Episodes

Series overview

Season 1 (2014)

Season 2 (2015)

See also
 Kinne Tonight

References

External links 
 
 

2014 Australian television series debuts
7mate original programming
English-language television shows
2010s Australian comedy television series
Television shows set in Melbourne
Australian television sketch shows